A dental consonant is a consonant articulated with the tongue against the upper teeth, such as  , . In some languages, dentals are distinguished from other groups, such as alveolar consonants, in which the tongue contacts the gum ridge. Dental consonants share acoustic similarity and in Latin script are generally written with consistent symbols (e.g. t, d, n).

When there is no room under the letter, it may be placed above, using the character , such as in /p͆/.

Cross-linguistically
For many languages, such as Albanian, Irish and Russian, velarization is generally associated with more dental articulations of coronal consonants. Thus, velarized consonants, such as Albanian , tend to be dental or denti-alveolar, and non-velarized consonants tend to be retracted to an alveolar position.

Sanskrit, Hindustani and all other Indo-Aryan languages have an entire set of dental stops that occur phonemically as voiced and voiceless and with or without aspiration. The nasal  also exists but is quite alveolar and apical in articulation. To native speakers, the English alveolar  and  sound more like the corresponding retroflex consonants of their languages than like dentals.

Although denti-alveolar consonants are often described as dental, it is the point of contact farthest to the back that is most relevant, defines the maximum acoustic space of resonance and gives a characteristic sound to a consonant. In French, the contact that is farthest back is alveolar or sometimes slightly pre-alveolar.

Occurrence
Dental/denti-alveolar consonants as transcribed by the International Phonetic Alphabet include:

See also
 Denti-alveolar consonant
 Place of articulation
 Index of phonetics articles

References

Sources
 
 
 
 
 

Place of articulation